The Brazilian ironclad Sete de Setembro was a wooden-hulled armored frigate built for the Imperial Brazilian Navy during the Paraguayan War in the late 1860s. Construction was delayed by a debate over her armament and she was not completed until 1874, by which time the ship was essentially obsolete. Sete de Setembro was transferred to Rio de Janeiro in the 1880s and captured by the rebels during the Fleet Revolt of 1893–94. She sank after she caught fire when the government forces recaptured her in late 1893.

Design and description
Sete de Setembro was designed as an enlarged, and seaworthy, version of the casemate ironclad  as part of the 1867 Naval Program, but she was ultimately classified as an armored frigate. Before construction began weather decks were added fore and aft to improve seaworthiness and protect the capstans fore and aft.

Sete de Setembro normally displaced . Her crew numbered 185 officers and men.

Propulsion
Sete de Setembro had two John Penn & Sons 2-cylinder steam engines, each of which drove a single  propeller.

Armament
Two choices were debated for the ship's armament. The first was for six muzzle-loading 150-pounder Whitworth guns mounted in a central casemate with the end guns pivoting to fire either fore or aft. The second option was for two gun turrets, each mounting a pair of 300-pounder Whitworth guns. A compromise was reached with a casemate armed with four 300-pounder Whitworth guns on pivot mounts at the corners. A new controversy arose, however, over the choice of Whitworth guns as the navy preferred Armstrong weapons. A decision in favor of the Whitworth guns was finally made after a debate of several years, which delayed the completion of the ship.

Armor

Service
Sete de Setembro was laid down at the Arsenal de Marinha da Corte in Rio de Janeiro on 8 January 1868, during the late stages of the Paraguayan War (also known as the War of the Triple Alliance), which saw Argentina and Brazil allied against Paraguay. She was launched on 16 May 1874, after lengthy delays as to her armament, and commissioned on 4 July 1874 by which time she was obsolete. She was briefly placed into reserve between August 1876 and June 1877. The ship was stationed in Montevideo during the early 1880s before she was transferred to Rio de Janeiro in 1884. Sete de Setembro was assigned to the Evolution Squadron in November 1885 despite having been reclassified in 1879 as a floating battery by virtue of her weak armor and lack of compartmentalization. By 1893, however, her engines had been removed and she was captured by the rebels during the Fleet Revolt of 1893–94. They had her towed to a position near Armação Beach to be used as a stationary guard post. The ship was recaptured on 16 December 1893, but she sank after catching fire.

Footnotes

References

External links
 Brief history of Sete de Setembro 

Ships built in Brazil
Frigates of the Brazilian Navy
Ironclad warships of the Brazilian Navy
Maritime incidents in 1893
1874 ships
Ship fires
Shipwrecks of Brazil